Nick Archer is an American politician who has served as the Oklahoma House of Representatives member from the 55th district since November 16, 2022.

Early life and education 
Nick Archer was born in Sayre, Oklahoma and his family moved to Elk City, Oklahoma when he was a child. He graduated from the University of Oklahoma with a bachelor
s degree in architecture.

Career
Archer works for Great Plains Analytical Services, a company that provides emissions testing for oil and gas companies. H also owns a firearm company, HFJ Outdoors.

Elk City
Archer served on Elk City, Oklahoma's zoning commission before later being elected mayor in 2019. He resigned in November 2022 and was succeeded by Cory Spieker.

Oklahoma House of Representatives
Archer announced his campaign for the Oklahoma House of Representatives in 2022 to succeed retiring Representative Todd Russ.  Tad Boone and Jeff Sawatzky also launched campaigns for the office. Archer won the primary outright avoiding a runoff and since no non-Republican candidate filed for the office there was no general election. He was sworn in on November 16, 2022.

Personal life
Archer is married to his wife Katie and they have two children.

References

21st-century American politicians
Living people
Mayors of places in Oklahoma
Republican Party members of the Oklahoma House of Representatives
Year of birth missing (living people)